The 1786 New York gubernatorial election was held in April 1786 to elect the Governor and Lieutenant Governor of New York.

Results
Incumbent Governor George Clinton and incumbent Lieutenant Governor Pierre Van Cortlandt were re-elected unopposed.

See also
New York gubernatorial elections
New York state elections

1786
United States gubernatorial elections in the 1780s
Gubernatorial